Todd Blodgett (born September 10, 1960) is an American conservative Republican political writer, who served as a member of the White House staff of President Ronald Reagan and on the Bush/Quayle election committee. Following the 1988 presidential election, Blodgett, who was a protege of the late Lee Atwater, then served on the staff of the Republican National Committee, where he worked until 1991. He was a one-time co-owner and operator of Resistance Records, the world's largest neo-Nazi music label. As has been reported by the Associated Press, The London Independent, Fox News, newspapers published by Lee Enterprises, Inc., Washington Post and in other media, Blodgett worked as a full-time, paid informant for the FBI. In this capacity, he was assigned to infiltrate/surveil neo-Nazis, KKK members, fascist Skinheads, professional anti-Semites, and Holocaust deniers in the United States, Europe, Canada, and the Caribbean.

Todd Blodgett has worked with notable American far-right figures such as William Pierce, David Duke, Don Black, Ed Fields, Paul Hall, Jr., Chris Temple, Richard Butler and Willis Carto. He also worked with and employed Mark Cotterill, a British neo-fascist who founded the American Friends of the British National Party (BNP), and other European racists, including John Tyndall, Nick Griffin, Richard Barnbrook and Steven Cartwright. From March 2000 to November 2002, Blodgett was retained by the Federal Bureau of Investigation to supply information concerning organizations and individuals affiliated with the racist Far right. He regularly met with and reported to FBI and  JTTF (the Joint Terrorism Task Force) agents and other officials, after attending gatherings hosted by Holocaust Deniers and White Supremacist  groups, which featured racist, far-right extremists who were of interest to American anti-terrorism law enforcement officials and agencies.

In 1972, Blodgett met J. Neil Reagan, whose younger brother was Ronald Reagan, the-then Governor of California. Neil ‘Moon’ Reagan introduced Blodgett to Ronald Reagan in 1976; between 1976 and 1980, Blodgett met with Ronald Reagan several times, all in Iowa. After graduating from Drake University in 1983, he worked for U.S. Senator Roger W. Jepsen. After Jepsen's 1984 defeat, Blodgett served on the Reagan-Bush Presidential Inaugural Committee, and then as a member of the Reagan White House staff, from 1985–1987.

In November, 1987, Blodgett began working for GOP strategist Lee Atwater on the presidential campaign of then-Vice President George H.W. Bush.  He served on Bush's campaign staff through the 1988 election, after which Atwater hired Mr. Blodgett to work at the Republican National Committee, where Mr. Atwater was chairman. At the RNC, Blodgett specialized in opposition research and what were known as ‘wedge issues’, for use in the campaigns of Republican candidates. Blodgett remained with the RNC until 1991 when he formed an advertising agency in Washington, D.C.

Previous to his political career, Blodgett attended Shattuck-Saint Mary's as a young man and was an active alumni of the school.

References 

American political writers
American male non-fiction writers
Drake University alumni
Federal Bureau of Investigation informants
1960 births
Living people